The Doomben railway line is a railway line in the City of Brisbane, Queensland, Australia. It is the part of the Pinkenba railway line that still operates a regular passenger service.  Doomben, or dumben, is the Indigenous Yuggera name for a tree fern which was prolific in the area. The railway line branches from the North Coast line at Eagle Junction, extending  to the industrial suburb of Pinkenba, situated on the northern bank at the mouth of the Brisbane River. It is part of the Queensland Rail City network.

History

The initial  section of the line opened on 3 September 1882 to Ascot (then named Racecourse) to serve the Eagle Farm racecourse, though nearby residents successfully lobbied for a regular passenger service. The line was extended  to Pinkenba railway station in 1897, mainly to serve an industrial area, including wharves on the north side of the Brisbane River. The passenger service was timed to coincide with the starting and finishing times of the workers.

During World War I and World War II, with deep berthing available to ships at Pinkenba on the mouth of the Brisbane River, troops camped in the Pinkenba and Meeandah localities.  Passenger ships used the Pinkenba Wharf, and special trains ran from Brisbane to Pinkenba.

Earthworks were undertaken to duplicate the line in the 1950s, hence the double sided, island platform at Clayfield. including regrading the line which eliminated the Sandgate Rd level crossing, but the program was abandoned before the second track was laid.

The line was electrified in 1988, but only to Eagle Farm, the next station after current suburban terminus Doomben; only diesel-hauled services could travel the full length of the line, and those were infrequent.  All passenger services on the line were suspended in September 1993 as part of a statewide rationalisation of the rail network with the closing or suspending of under-utilised or unprofitable rail lines.  Only a few special services were run on the line on days of major race events at adjoining race tracks.

Electric passenger services resumed on 27 January 1998, but only as far as Doomben, with bus connections to the stations beyond Doomben.

The Doomben to Pinkenba section is used only for freight and occasional special trains, such as heritage services described below.

Heritage services
QR occasionally run special steam trains on the entire Pinkenba line as part of their semi-regular "Steam Train Sunday" excursion service. This is the only way to travel on the full length of the line.

Line guide and services
All services stop at all stations to Roma Street railway station.  The typical travel time between Doomben and Brisbane City is approximately 18 minutes (to Central).

Doomben line services typically terminate at Roma Street or Park Road, while some peak services continue to Kuraby or Cleveland. No rail services operate on Sundays or public holidays.

Passengers for/from the Airport, Caboolture, Nambour and Gympie North and Shorncliffe lines change at Eagle Junction, Ferny Grove at Bowen Hills, and all other lines at Roma Street.

References

External links
Queensland Rail

Brisbane railway lines
Public transport in Brisbane
3 ft 6 in gauge railways in Australia